Longford is a small village near the town of Market Drayton, Shropshire, England. It is just off the A53, near to Ternhill and lies in the parish of Moreton Say.

Longford is 1.5 miles west of Market Drayton and 1 mile southeast of Moreton Say.  A topographical guide to Shropshire published in 2005 describes Longford as a "charming hamlet on a rise in undulating country."

The village name is believed to come from a great road that existed in Roman times and was simply known as the Longford. By 1319 it was a Royal road between Bletchley and Hinstock to the south. The village, not on the road, is located just east of Bletchley.

Notable people
Major-general Sir James Rutherford Lumley KCB (1773–1846), Bengal Army

See also
Listed buildings in Moreton Say

References

External links

Longford - hamlet in Moreton Say Parish
Map of Longford west of Market Drayton

Villages in Shropshire